Woodford Bridge is part of the East London suburb of Woodford, in the London Borough of Redbridge.  It is located on an old road between Chigwell and Leytonstone.

Notable features
Its notable features include St Paul's Church, Woodford Bridge.
There is a small Primary School and Nursery, Roding Primary School.
There are also local amenities, including supermarkets, restaurants and cafe’s.
St. Pauls Church offers a variety of services and a nearby lake located 100 metres to the right.

Transportation
Woodford Bridge is served by London Buses routes 275 and W14. The 275 connects to Barkingside, Woodford Station (Central Line), Woodford Green, Highams Park and Walthamstow. The W14 connects to South Woodford tube station, Snaresbrook, Wanstead, Leytonstone and Leyton. Route 549 runs every 70 minutes (South Woodford to Loughton via Buckhurst Hill), the closest bus stop from Woodford Bridge is located on Chigwell Road.

The closest station is Woodford. It is served by the Central Line and located approximately 1 mile from Woodford Bridge.
Trains run towards West Ruislip and Ealing Broadway via Central London. And eastbound services towards Epping.
This station is the start of the ‘Hainault loop’. Services run from Woodford to Hainault via Chigwell and Grange Hill every half an hour.

Notable people

References

Areas of London
Districts of the London Borough of Redbridge